Rock petroglyphs are found at Drotten, Fåberg, in Lillehammer municipality in the county of Oppland, Norway. The petroglyphs are located west of the river Lågen about 1.5 km above the Brunlaug bridge (they are difficult to reach when the river is flooded).

There are a total of 11 petroglyphs within a 4 m² area on a cliff by the river. Seven of these petroglyphs could be moose. The rest are more ambiguous, but are also likely to be moose. The carvings are narrow and shallow, with the largest being 45 cm across.

See also
Pre-historic art
Petroglyph
History of Norway
List of World Heritage Sites in Europe
Rock carvings in Norway

External links
 Rock art at Directorate for Cultural Heritage — in Norwegian (there are also english pages)

Drotten
Culture in Oppland